St. Francis Health Center, originally St. Francis Hospital was a hospital located in Colorado Springs, Colorado which closed in 2010.  The closing came after the opening of St. Francis Medical Center in 2008.

References

External links
 Photograph archives from the Pike Peak Library District website

Buildings and structures in Colorado Springs, Colorado
Defunct hospitals in Colorado
1887 establishments in Colorado
2010 disestablishments in Colorado
Religious organizations established in 1887
Hospitals established in 1887
Hospitals disestablished in 2010